The Mudi is a herding dog breed from Hungary. It is closely related to the Puli and Pumi, from which it was separated in the 1930s. They continue to be used in herding, as well as participating in a variety of dog sports.

History 
The Mudi was first discovered as a breed in 1936 by Dr. Dezso Fenyes in Hungary, where it became known as the "driver dog." Mudis nearly disappeared shortly after their recognition, as many were killed off during World War II. The breed became recognized by The Federation Cynologique Internationale in 1966.
On Jan. 5th 2022, the Mudi was recognized by the AKC as a purebred breed.

Description 
Mudis are a high energy breed, and tend to succeed in herding and agility. Mudis have a lifespan of 12-14 years with proper care. Adult Mudis are 14-18 inches in height  and usually weigh around 18-29 lbs.

Appearance 

The Mudi has a medium coat length and a curly coat type. Mudis are born with various lengths of tails from bobtails to long full length tails. Dogs born with short or natural bobtail will be indicated on the FCI pedigree.

Exercise and activities 
The Mudi is a very active breed. They need to be taken on daily, long, brisk walks or jogs. In addition, they will benefit from a large safe area where they can run free. They need a lot of running and other exercises to be in good condition. They love to play and will excel in all kinds of dog sports such as Frisbee. The Mudi can compete in dog agility trials, obedience, Rally obedience, Schutzhund, showmanship, flyball, tracking, and herding events. Herding instincts and trainability can be measured at noncompetitive herding tests. Mudi that exhibit basic herding instincts can be trained to compete in herding trials.

See also
 Hungarian dog breeds
 Dogs portal
 List of dog breeds

References

External links

FCI breeds
Dog breeds originating in Hungary
Herding dogs
Rare dog breeds